Richard Kim (November 17, 1917 – November 8, 2001) was an American martial artist.  He was an instructor of various disciplines, including Okinawan Kobudo and Shōrinji-ryū Karate.

Early life and career
Kim was born in Honolulu, Hawaii and began studying judo as a child in the early 1920s, under Kaneko. Around the same time, he also began studying karate under Arakaki Ankichi. Before World War II, his service in the United States Merchant Marine took him to east Asia. He cited many martial artists as his teachers, including Tachibana, Chen Chen Yuan, and Choa Hsu Lai. While in Japan, Kim studied Daito-ryu under Kotaro Yoshida and lived with him for seven years. Kim stated that he had in his possession the Daito-ryu scrolls and had been granted the Daito-ryu menkyo kaiden.<ref>For an anecdotal article on Richard Kim, see: Simon, Geraldine (1963). 20th Century Warriors: Prominent Men in the Oriental Fighting Arts.</ref> Kim also studied and taught Japanese and Okinawan weaponry.

Teaching career
In 1959, Kim began teaching martial arts in San Francisco. He traveled extensively throughout the United States, Canada, and Europe teaching wherever he went. As well as teaching the physical aspects of the martial arts, Kim taught the philosophy, history, strategy, and spiritual aspects. He died on November 8, 2001.

Kim wrote a monthly column for Karate Illustrated magazine, and wrote a number of books including: The Weaponless Warriors, The Classical Man, and an instructional series on weaponry (Kobudo). There has been some controversy surrounding The Weaponless Warriors, published in 1974, as the bulk of the work appears taken, without acknowledgement, directly from Eizo Shimabukuro's 1963 work Old Grandmaster Stories, which was translated into English for the first time in 2003.  Kim was named Black Belt Magazine's "Karate Sensei of the Year", in 1967, and was later inducted into the Black Belt Magazine'' Hall of Fame. Kim was the Director of the American Amateur Karate Federation and Vice-President for the International Traditional Karate Federation (ITKF). At his memorial service, Hidetaka Nishiyama of the ITKF presented Kim with the rank of Judan (10th degree black belt) posthumously.

Kim's students continue through a number of organizations: the Kokusai Butokukai is the international organization that Richard Kim started as the Busen Butoku Kai.  It is made up of Zen Bei Butoku Kai (founded by Richard Kim in 1959), Butoku Kai Canada, Butoku Kai France, Germany, Spain, Poland, Finland,  and Scotland.  The Bu Toku Do was founded by Don Warrener, a senior student of Richard Kim.  The Zen Bei Butokukai International was also founded by two of Richard Kim's senior students, Brian Ricci and Frank Gaviola.

References

External links
 KOKUSAI BUTOKUKAI – Official Homepage
 Zen Bei Butoku-Kai International

American male karateka
American people of Korean descent
1917 births
2001 deaths